Ben Longley (born August 7, 1930), was an American politician in the state of Tennessee. Longley served in the Tennessee House of Representatives from 1967 to 1978 and in the Tennessee Senate from 1979 to 1987. A Republican, he represented Bradley County, Tennessee and worked as an insurance broker. He lives in Cleveland, Tennessee.

References

1930 births
Living people
Members of the Tennessee House of Representatives